Cybermind is an Internet mailing list devoted to "the philosophy and psychology of cyberspace".

History
It was co-founded by Alan Sondheim and Michael Current in mid-1994 to explore, exemplify and discuss multiple aspects of cyberspace, both from theoretical and experiential perspectives. The list was born in the split of the spoon collective lists from the Thinknet group, over issues of free speech and appropriate philosophical expression. Early membership involved much overlap with the Futureculture List. In more recent years discussions have become more general, but the list still has members from its founding period. Michael Current died shortly after the founding of the group.

List discussion has resulted in books, articles, conferences, more than one academic thesis, a group novel (now available through Lulu.com), and a strong ongoing community. Cybermind itself has been the subject of academic research, including an anthropological doctoral dissertation by Jonathan Marshall at the University of Sydney, which has now been published as the book Living on Cybermind. The book details the life of people on Cybermind over the period from 1994 to 2006 and uses many quotations from list members to analyse the ambiguities of net presence and absence (which is called asence), the paradoxes of the public/private divide, difficulties arising around authenticity and aggression, netsex, net-politics, and the construction of 'community'.

The other major gathering of writing about Cybermind is a collection of online essays about gender online and its role in the group's life.

Publications

Refereed

 Argyle, Katie. "Life After Death", in Rob Shields ed. Cultures of Internet: Virtual Spaces, Real Histories, Living Bodies. Sage, London 1996.
 Cubbison, Laurie. "What does it Mean to Write from the Body", Women and Language vol. 20, no. 1, 1997, pp. 31–35.
 Don, Alexanne. "The dynamics of gender perception and status in email-mediated group interaction", Transforming Cultures eJournal, vol. 2, no. 2 (2007).
 Kiley, Dean. "John John and Di Die Live on the Internet: Cyberbullying on Academic Mailing Lists", Mesh: a Journal of Experimental Media Arts, 13, 1999/2000.
 Marshall, Jonathan Paul. "Culture, Disorder, and Death in an Online World", in Honglei Li (ed) Virtual Community Participation and Motivation: Cross-Disciplinary Theories. IGI Global, 2012: pp. 330–346.
 Marshall, Jonathan Paul. "Ambiguity, Oscillation and Disorder: Online Ethnography and the Making of Culture", Cosmopolitan Civil Societies Journal 2(3), 2010: 1–22.
 Marshall, Jonathan Paul "Cybermind: Paradoxes of Relationship in an Online Group", in Samantha Holland (ed). Remote Relationships in a Small World, Peter Lang 2008.
 Marshall, Jonathan Paul. "Gender in Online Worlds: An Introduction to, and Summary of, Cybermind Research", Transforming Cultures eJournal, vol. 2, no. 2 (2007)
 Marshall, Jonathan. "The Mobilisation of Race and Gender on an Internet Mailing List", Transforming Cultures eJournal, vol. 2, no. 2 (2007)
 Marshall, Jonathan Paul Living on Cybermind: Categories, Communication and Control, Peter Lang, New York, 2007
 Marshall, Jonathan. "Categories, Gender and Online Community", E-Learning, 3(2), 2006.
 Marshall, Jonathan. "The Online Body Breaks Out? Asence, Ghosts, Cyborgs, Gender, Polarity and Politics", Fibreculture, issue 3, 2005.
 Marshall, Jonathan. "Governance, Structure and Existence: Authenticity, Rhetoric, Race and Gender on an Internet Mailing List", Proceedings of the Australian Electronic Governance Conference 2004, Centre for Public Policy, University of Melbourne.
 Marshall, Jonathan. "The Sexual Life of Cyber-Savants”, The Australian Journal of Anthropology 14(2), 2003: 229–248.
 Marshall, Jonathan. (2001) "Cyberspace or Cybertopos: The creation of online space", Social Analysis 45(1) 2001: 81–102.
 Maus, Fred Everett. "We Were Online", Perspectives of New Music, vol. 43/44; (2/1), 2005, pp. 314–337. 
 Milne, Esther. "The Epistolary Body of Email: Presence, Disembodiment and the Sublime" The Southern Review 35.3 (2002) pp. 80–93 [mention only]
 Milne, Esther. "Email and Epistolary technologies: Presence, Intimacy, Disembodiment", Fibreculture, issue 2, 2003
 Milne, Esther. "'Dragging her dirt all over the net': Presence, Intimacy, Materiality", Transforming Cultures eJournal, vol. 2, no. 2 (2007)
 Milne, Esther Letters, Postcards, Email: Technologies of Presence, Routledge, London, 2010.
 Ruane, Dierdre. "Weavers & Warriors? Gender and Online Identity in 1997 and 2007", Transforming Cultures eJournal, vol. 2, no. 2 (2007).
 Sondheim, Alan, ed. New Observations: Cultures of Cyberspace, vol. 120, 1999.
 Sondheim, Alan, ed. "Being Online: Net Subjectivity", Lusitania, vol.8, New York 1996.
 Spooner, Michael & Yancey, Kathleen. "Postings on a Genre of Email", College Composition and Communication, vol. 47, no. 2 (May 1996), pp. 252–278 [mention only]

Unrefereed
 Crawford, Karen. "Letters from", Transforming Cultures eJournal, 2(2) December 2007: 128–139.
 Ghaly, Salwa. "Reflections on Cybermind", Transforming Cultures eJournal, 2(2) 2007: 158–172.
 lynne. "Cybermind: A Case Study", April 17, 2005
 Marshall, Jonathan Paul. "Cybermind discusses gender", Transforming Cultures E-Journal 2(2) 2007: 226–266.
 Sondheim, Alan. "Gender and You", Transforming Cultures E-Journal 2(2) 2007: 194–200.

Unpublished theses
 Hoberman, David. Body, Text and Presence on the Internet, honours thesis, Department of Anthropology, Tufts University, 1996.
 Ruane, Deirdre. Citizens of Cyberia: Explorations of Self and Society on the Internet, study submitted in part fulfilment of the requirement for the award of Bachelor of Arts degree in Communication Studies at Dublin City University, August 1997

Fiction
 Blaze Rosewood. Cybermind Novel'' (2008), Alchemical Elephant, Sydney

External links
 Another Cybermind Web Page
 CYBERMIND@LISTSERV.WVU.EDU

Electronic mailing lists
Cyberspace
Projects established in 1994